Thomas Winstanley was the eighteenth intendant (mayor) of Charleston, South Carolina, serving one term between 1804 and 1805. He had been elected as a warden (city council member) for Charleston on September 23, 1801. On October 5, 1803, he was elected intendant pro tem during the absence of the intendant.

Winstanley died on November 4, 1832, and he is buried at St. Philips Episcopal Church in Charleston, South Carolina.

References

Mayors of Charleston, South Carolina
1755 births
1832 deaths
South Carolina city council members
South Carolina colonial people
Burials in South Carolina